Jay Elliot Henderson (born September 17, 1978) is a former Canadian professional ice hockey winger. He is currently an assistant coach with the Kootenay Ice of the Western Hockey League. Henderson was the final player drafted in the 1997 NHL Entry Draft, picked in the ninth round, 246th overall, by the Boston Bruins.

Playing career
After playing four seasons in the Western Hockey League, with the Red Deer Rebels and Edmonton Ice, Henderson made his professional debut with the Bruins' American Hockey League affiliate, the Providence Bruins, in the 1997–98 season.  He made his NHL debut with the Bruins during the 1998–99 season, appearing in four games. He appeared in 29 more games with the Bruins over the next two seasons.  To date, he has no further NHL experience.  In 33 career NHL games, Henderson recorded one goal and three assists.

Henderson played for Augsburger Panther and Frankfurt Lions of Germany's DEL during the 2005–06 and 2006–07 seasons.

In 2008–09 season, Henderson swapped Germany for Austria where he played for HC TWK Innsbruck

After playing in Europe for the previous few years, Henderson started the 2009–10 season at ECHL team Victoria Salmon Kings where he played only 2 games before moving to the Central Hockey League's Wichita Thunder. Henderson did not settle in Wichita and soon decided to accept a contract with British Elite Ice Hockey League's Nottingham Panthers in January 2010, where he settled into life as a Panther in time for the playoffs.

On May 15, 2010, Henderson signed a deal to return to play for the British Elite Ice Hockey League's Nottingham Panthers; this was short lived as he was sent home to recover from a back-neck injury.

Coaching career
On June 27, 2013, Henderson was hired as an assistant coach for the Kootenay Ice of the Western Hockey League.

Career statistics

References

External links

1978 births
Living people
Augsburger Panther players
Boston Bruins draft picks
Boston Bruins players
Canadian ice hockey left wingers
Edmonton Ice players
Frankfurt Lions players
Hartford Wolf Pack players
Houston Aeros (1994–2013) players
Ice hockey people from Edmonton
Milwaukee Admirals players
Nottingham Panthers players
Providence Bruins players
Red Deer Rebels players
Victoria Salmon Kings players
Wichita Thunder players
Canadian expatriate ice hockey players in England
Canadian expatriate ice hockey players in Germany